was a  after Tengen and before Kanna. This period spanned the years from April 983  through April 985.

Change of era
 February 16, 983 ]: The new era name was created to mark an event or a number of events. The previous era ended and a new one commenced in Tengen 6, on the 15th day of the 4th month of 983.

Events of the Eikan era
 October 6, 983 (Eikan 1, 27th day of the 8th month): In the 15th year of Emperor En'yu's reign (円融天皇15年), he abdicated; and the succession (senso) was received by a nephew. Shortly thereafter, Emperor Kazan is said to have acceded to the throne (sokui).
 September/October 983 (Eikan 1, 8th month): Chōnen, the Buddhist monk of the Tendai school embarked on a voyage to China accompanied by 5 or 6 disciples.

Notes

References
 Brown, Delmer M. and Ichirō Ishida, eds. (1979).  Gukanshō: The Future and the Past. Berkeley: University of California Press. ;  OCLC 251325323
 Iwao, Seiichi. (2002).  Dictionnaire historique du Japon (Vol. I),  (Vol. II)  (with Teizō Iyanaga, Susumu Ishii, Shōichirō Yoshida et al.). Paris: Maisonneuve & Larose. ;  OCLC 51096469
 Nussbaum, Louis-Frédéric and Käthe Roth. (2005).  Japan encyclopedia. Cambridge: Harvard University Press. ;  OCLC 58053128
 Titsingh, Isaac. (1834). Nihon Ōdai Ichiran; ou,  Annales des empereurs du Japon.  Paris: Royal Asiatic Society, Oriental Translation Fund of Great Britain and Ireland. OCLC 5850691
 Varley, H. Paul. (1980). A Chronicle of Gods and Sovereigns: Jinnō Shōtōki of Kitabatake Chikafusa. New York: Columbia University Press. ;  OCLC 6042764

External links
 National Diet Library, "The Japanese Calendar" -- historical overview plus illustrative images from library's collection

Japanese eras